West Allerton railway station serves the suburb of Allerton, Liverpool in the north west of England.

History
The station opened on 2 January 1939. Allerton station was to the south, but it closed in 2005 to make way for Liverpool South Parkway which opened the following year.

Facilities
There are four platforms, two of which, platforms 1 and 2, are located on the fast lines and are where most trains stop. Platforms 3 and 4 are on the slow lines and are used infrequently, mainly where faster services are booked to overtake stopping services on this stretch of line (This is most common in the Liverpool-bound direction). The platform layout consists of three structures:

 Platform 1 - single faced, on the Up Fast line.
 Platform 2-3 - double faced, between the Down Fast line & Up Slow lines.
 Platform 4 - single faced, on the Down Slow line.

All platforms have a basic glass and metal shelter approximately halfway along; the central island platform (2-3) is fully enclosed, whereas the outer platforms have single sided ones. Help points are provided for emergency use and for train running information (there is also a P.A system in place to provide automated service announcements). In 2020 the station had new dot-matrix public information screens installed inside the glass shelter areas along the platforms.

The station building on the over bridge has a staffed booking office that is open during hours when trains are serving the station, this is operated by Northern Trains though sponsored by Merseytravel. There is no step-free access to the platforms, as the footbridge from the ticket office to platform level has stairs.

Services

Services are roughly half-hourly in each direction, towards Mossley Hill and Liverpool Lime Street to the west and towards Liverpool South Parkway and Manchester Oxford Road in the east. This consists of two trains per hour, eastbound to Manchester Oxford Road via Warrington Central, and westbound to Liverpool Lime Street, all operated by Northern Trains.

The stopping pattern varies between departures, with one eastbound train calling at all stations to Warrington but limited stops thereafter, whilst the other serves principal stations only to Warrington but most stops beyond. In the evenings and on Sundays the frequency is hourly in each direction.

References

External links

Railway stations in Liverpool
DfT Category E stations
Former London, Midland and Scottish Railway stations
Railway stations in Great Britain opened in 1939
Northern franchise railway stations